St Peter's Collegiate Academy (formerly St Peter's Collegiate School) is a mixed Church of England secondary school and sixth form located in the Compton area of Wolverhampton in the West Midlands of England. The school is named after Saint Peter, one of the Twelve Apostles of Jesus Christ.

The school was established in 1844 and maintains strong links with St Peter's Collegiate Church. St Peter's Collegiate School became a voluntary aided school as a result of the Education Act 1944. In 2012 the school converted to academy status and was later renamed St Peter's Collegiate Academy. The school is administered by the Diocese of Lichfield.

St Peter's Collegiate Academy offers GCSEs and BTECs as programmes of study for pupils, while students in the sixth form have the option to study from a range of A-levels and further BTECs.

Notable former pupils

Don Howe, former football player, coach, manager and pundit
Eluned Parrott, Liberal Democrat politician
Hugh Porter, former cyclist
Arthur Rowley, former football and cricket player
Liam Payne, singer, member of One Direction
Mike Perkins, artist, Marvel Comics
Tom Parry, comedian and member of Pappy's
Matthew Hudson-Smith, British track and field sprinter

References

External links
St Peter's Collegiate Academy official website

Secondary schools in Wolverhampton
Educational institutions established in 1844
1844 establishments in England
Church of England secondary schools in the Diocese of Lichfield
Academies in Wolverhampton